Library Bards are a nerd parody band based in Los Angeles, California, consisting of reality personalities Bonnie Gordon (ABC's The Quest) and Xander Jeanneret (TBS' King of the Nerds). They are known for taking pop songs and re-writing them as nerd-centric parody songs. Topics of their songs include Sci-Fi, Cosplay, Gaming, and Fantasy.

History 

Xander and Bonnie had known each other before being cast on their respective reality competition shows. Both had gone on to become the "fan-favorites" of their shows, and wanted to continue performing at comic and pop culture conventions. Their first song "Gandalf" (a parody of Taylor Swift's "Shake it Off") was created in collaboration with the fan site theonering.net, and debuted before the final installment of the Hobbit films. The song debuted as #1 in the comedy genre in Los Angeles on the music website Reverbnation, #2 nationally, and #3 globally in December 2014. The Library Bards continue to hold a top spot in the Comedy genre in Los Angeles.

Music 

Both Bonnie and Xander collaborate on writing the lyrics to each of their songs, and they employ a third party to create the backing tracks for the music. Past collaborators have included Jake Kaufman, Bonecage, Breakmaster Cylinder, and Ben and Michael McGeehee.

Nerd Parody Music 

The Library Bards consider themselves a "Nerd Parody Band", which focuses on topics and "fandoms" that are generally considered nerdy or geeky. Some have placed them in the category of Filk music, and the Library Bards work within that category as well. They have been featured on the comedy music Dr. Demento show and on The FuMP.

Touring

Amazing! Tour (2015) 
The Library Bards started touring Comic and Pop Culture conventions in 2015, including the Amazing! Comic Con series. The list of cities included:

 Los Angeles, CA
 Indianapolis, IN
 Ventura, CA
 Houston, TX
 Honolulu, HI
 San Francisco, CA
 Oklahoma City, OK

Level Up! Tour (2016) 
The Library Bards continued to tour over 50 comic and pop culture conventions in 2016, including:
 WonderCon (LA)
 Pasadena Comic Con (Pasadena)
 Orlando, FL Concert
 Anime Fan Fest (New Jersey)
 Amazing! Hawaii Comic Con
 BayCon (San Francisco)
 Ninja-Con (LA)
 LA CosplayCon
 Amazing! Las Vegas Comic Con
 Anime Expo (LA)
 San Diego Comic Con
 Wizard World Chicago
 FuMPFest (Chicago)
 Amazing Houston Comic Con
 NerdBot Con
 Santa Clarita Valley Comic Con
 Louisiana Comic Con (Lafayette)
 LosCon

BARDCORE Tour (2017) 
The Library Bards toured for their first full studio album, BARDCORE, bringing their high energy performances to the stages across the country, including:
 The Pack Theater (Los Angeles)
 Long Beach Comic Expo
 MarsCon (Minneapolis)
 Tulare Sci-Fi Con (Tulare)
 LouisiAnime (Baton Rouge)
 FantasticKon (Santa Clarita, CA)
 BurlyQuest (Los Angeles)
 WonderCon (Los Angeles)
 WhedonCon (Los Angeles)
 WyrdCon (Los Angeles)
 BayCon (San Mateo)
 FuMPFest (Chicago)
 Amazing Las Vegas Comic Con
 Anime Expo (Los Angeles)
 San Diego Comic Con
 Amazing Hawaii Comic Con
 Quest-Con (Mobile, AL)
 Game-A-Con (Las Vegas)
 Van Nuys Comedy Club (Los Angeles)
 Long Beach Comic Con
 LosCon (Los Angeles)

Discography

Studio albums 

 BARDCORE (March 2017)
 BomBARDed (10 September 2019)

EPs 

 Library Bards EP (CD only, July 2016)

Compilation albums 

 The FuMP Vol. 55 – "Gandalf" (January–February 2016)
 The FuMP Vol. 59 – "Warriors for Hire" (September–October 2016)
 FuMPFest 2016 – Live! (CD & Online, January 2017)

Music videos 
The Library Bards have released several music videos for their songs. Most popular is the music video for "Gandalf", which was in collaboration with the Lord of the Rings Fansite theonering.net. Typical Library Bards music videos feature popular cosplayers in the nerd community, as well as appearances by voice actors and other talent.

Television and media appearances 
Bonnie Gordon appeared on ABC's The Quest and Xander Jeanneret was a finalist on TBS' King of the Nerds Season 2. Since these appearances, the Library Bards can be seen as a pair on CBS' Celebrity Name Game twice in 2016, and Bonnie Gordon appeared on SyFy's Geeks Who Drink. The Library Bards also appear on the LGBTQ Streaming application REVRY 

Bonnie Gordon is also a voice actress for the English version of Street Fighter V, providing the voice of the character R. Mika Gordon provides the voice of the Narwhal Magisword, Dolphin-Chan and one of the Barnacles in Cartoon Network's Mighty Magiswords episode "Unconventional Dolphism", created by The FuMP member Kyle A. Carrozza with FuMP member Luke Ski as storyboard artist, writer and voice actor. Gordon reprised her roles as the Narwhal Magisword, as well as the character Nana Mewfles in the episode "For the Love of Narwhal". Gordon and Jeanneret previously did a cover parody of the song "We Didn't Start the Fire" based on the series, titled "Warriors for Hire!".

Xander Jeanneret is a voice actor for the independent fighting game Divekick, providing the voice of the Announcer.

The Library Bards provided a musical trailer for the Geek and Sundry streaming show Callisto 6, in which Gordon plays main cast character Lindy "Hopps" Hopper and Jeanneret plays recurring cast character Cobalt.

References

External links 
 Library Bards
 Library Bards on iTunes
 Library Bards on Spotify

Musical groups from Los Angeles
Parody musicians
American parodists
American comedy musical groups
American musical duos
American comedy duos
Nerd-folk musicians
Musical groups established in 2014
Comedians from California
2014 establishments in California